San Carlos Park is a census-designated place (CDP) in Lee County, Florida, United States. The population was 18,563 at the 2020 census. It is part of the Cape Coral-Fort Myers, Florida Metropolitan Statistical Area.

Geography
San Carlos Park is located in south-central Lee County at  (26.474458, -81.815467). It is an unincorporated community, bordered to the south by the village of Estero and to the east by the Three Oaks CDP. U.S. Route 41 forms the western edge of San Carlos Park, leading north  to Fort Myers, the county seat, and south through Estero and Bonita Springs  to Naples.

The land in the CDP drains west via Mullock Creek to Estero Bay, an estuary connected to the Gulf of Mexico.

Demographics

At the 2000 census there were 16,317 people, 5,901 households, and 4,449 families in the CDP. The racial makup of the CDP was 93.84% White, 1.26% African American, 0.34% Native American, 0.70% Asian, 0.01% Pacific Islander, 2.31% from other races, and 1.54% from two or more races. Hispanic or Latino of any race were 8.14%.

Of the 5,901 households 42.5% had children under the age of 18 living with them, 58.2% were married couples living together, 11.3% had a female householder with no husband present, and 24.6% were non-families. 16.5% of households were one person and 4.4% were one person aged 65 or older.  The average household size was 2.77 and the average family size was 3.09.

The age distribution was 29.3% under the age of 18, 6.9% from 18 to 24, 36.7% from 25 to 44, 18.5% from 45 to 64, and 8.7% 65 or older.  The median age was 34 years. For every 100 females, there were 102.3 males.  For every 100 females age 18 and over, there were 98.6 males.

The median household income was $45,870 and the median family income  was $48,740. Males had a median income of $31,768 versus $25,541 for females. The per capita income for the CDP was $19,022.  About 6.1% of families and 8.0% of the population were below the poverty line, including 8.8% of those under age 18 and 7.2% of those age 65 or over.

History 
Brothers Jules & Jack Freeman established San Carlos Park in 1953 in hopes of providing low cost homes for the middle class. 

The Freeman group purchased their land from the Koreshan Unity who gave them almost 250 acres for just under $3,000. When they acquired the land in Estero, Florida, they found that it was in the middle of nowhere, with the county seat, Fort Myers, Florida, being over 20 miles away.

In the 1970s, the Freeman's drilled down into the ground and hit a spring, this spring would become a local attraction located at the San Carlos Park arches

Later on in the mid-1970s the Freeman group would go on to begin construction of their next community Three Oaks, Florida.

References

Census-designated places in Lee County, Florida
Census-designated places in Florida